This is a list of settlements in the Rethymno regional unit, Greece.

 Achlades
 Adele
 Agia Foteini
 Agia Galini
 Agia Paraskevi
 Agia
 Agios Ioannis, Agios Vasileios
 Agios Ioannis, Amari
 Agios Ioannis, Mylopotamos
 Agios Konstantinos
 Agios Mamas
 Agios Vasileios
 Agkouseliana
 Aimonas
 Akoumia
 Aktounta
 Alfa
 Aloides
 Amari
 Amnatos
 Angeliana
 Ano Meros
 Ano Valsamonero
 Anogeia
 Apladiana
 Apodoulou
 Archaia Eleftherna
 Archontiki
 Ardaktos
 Argyroupoli
 Armenoi
 Asomatos
 Atsipopoulo
 Axos
 Chamalevri
 Charkia
 Chonos
 Choumeri
 Chromonastiri
 Damavolos
 Doxaro
 Drimiskos
 Eleftherna
 Elenes
 Episkopi, Mylopotamos
 Episkopi, Rethymno
 Erfoi
 Fourfouras
 Frantzeskiana Metochia
 Garazo
 Gerakari
 Gerani
 Gonia
 Goulediana
 Kalandare
 Kalogeros
 Kalonyktis
 Kalyvos
 Kare
 Karines
 Karoti
 Kastellos
 Kato Poros
 Kato Valsamonero
 Kentrochori
 Kerames
 Kissos
 Koufi
 Koumoi
 Kouroutes
 Koxare
 Krya Vrysi
 Kryoneri
 Kyrianna
 Lampini
 Lampiotes
 Lefkogeia
 Livadia
 Lochria
 Malaki
 Margarites
 Mariou
 Maroulas
 Melampes
 Melidoni
 Melissourgaki
 Meronas
 Mesi
 Monastiraki
 Mountros
 Mourne
 Myriokefala
 Myrthios
 Myxorrouma
 Nithavri
 Orne
 Oros
 Orthes
 Pagkalochori
 Panormo
 Pantanassa
 Pasalites
 Patsos
 Perama
 Petrochori
 Pigi
 Platania
 Platanos
 Prasies
 Prines
 Prinos
 Rethymno
 Rodakino
 Roumeli
 Roussospiti
 Roustika
 Saitoures
 Saktouria
 Selli
 Sellia
 Sises
 Skepasti
 Skouloufia
 Spili
 Theodora
 Thronos
 Veni
 Vilandredo
 Vistagi
 Vizari
 Voleones
 Vryses
 Zoniana
 Zouridi

By municipality

Anogeia (no subdivisions)

See also
 List of towns and villages in Greece
 Rethymno (municipality)

 
Rethymno